Chhindwara is a city in India and a Municipal Corporation in Chhindwara district in the Indian state of Madhya Pradesh. The city is the administrative headquarters of Chhindwara District. Chhindwara is reachable by rail or road from adjacent cities Betul, Jabalpur and Nagpur. The nearest airport is in Nagpur (130 km); however there is a small airport located in the city which is not serviceable for passenger planes.

History 
It was believed that Chhindwara District was full of "Chhind" trees (wild date palms) many years ago, and the place was called "Chhind"-"Wada" (wada means place). Another story says that due to the population of lions (called "sinh" in Hindi), it was considered equivalent to entering the lions' den to enter this district. Hence, it was called "Sinh Dwara" (meaning " through the entrance of the lion"). In course of time, it became "Chhindwara".

The Gole Gunj market of the city, with its two large gateways (known today as Kamania Gate), was built by Captain Montgomery, who administrated the district as a regent of Richard Jenkins (1818–1830). The municipality of Chhindwara was founded in 1867.

Geography
Chhindwara is one of the largest cities in the Satpura range and the largest district in terms of area in Madhya Pradesh. It is on a plateau, surrounded by lush green fields, rivers and by dense forest with diverse flora and fauna. The town is built around the Bodri Stream, a tributary with the Kulbehra River & is the origin source of Pench River which flows across Pench National Park which includes Pench Tiger Reserve, which is one of the reserve for the Tiger Project of India.

Climate

Demographics
As per 2011 census, Chhindwara urban agglomeration had a population of 190,008, out of which 97,040 were males and 92,968 were females. The literacy rate was 89.25 per cent with male literacy being 93.77% and female literacy being 84.54%. Chhindwara urban agglomeration included Chhindwara (M), Khajari (OG), Khapabhat (OG), Kukadajagat (OG), Chandangaon (OG), Seoni Pranmoti (OG), Emaliya Bohata (OG) and Lonia Karbal (CT).

Economy
Chhindwara is home to brands like Raymond's & Hindustan Unilever. The city has rich market areas such as Mansarover Complex, Fawwara Chowk, Nagpur Road, Gole Gunj & Gandhi Gunj. Looking the spending capability of the local population all major automobile brands have made their presence in the city. Apart from this Parasia 
area is known for its coal fields and majority of population in this region is associated with Western Coalfields Limited for their employment.

Industries 
Coal Mines is run by Western coal fields limited (WCL)
The city is home to old industries of pottery, leather moots and ornaments of zinc, brass and bell metal. On the outskirts, vegetables, especially potatoes, are raised in large quantities for export to nearby districts. The town, which is a center for local trade and a market for the sale of cattle, grain and timber, also contains a grain market near the railway station. Following are some recognizable industries that have contributed to the industrial development of Chhindwara:

 Hindustan Unilever is a multinational company, originally from England. Earlier this company's name was Hindustan Lever Limited. Chhindwara Hindustan Unilever Limited is situated at village Lahgadua, 5 km from Chhindwara. This company completed 75 years in 2008. There are 210 workers in Hindustan Unilever, who work in four shifts. The Chhindwara factory produces three main products: Rin washing soap, Wheel washing powder and Surf Excel washing powder. It is the only factory of Hindustan Unilever in Madhya Pradesh. In 2007 the production was 70,000 units.
 Raymond Group: The Raymond Chhindwara plant, set up in 1991, is a state-of-the-art integrated manufacturing facility located 65 km from Chhindwara.
 Western Coalfields Limited is the major company of Chhindwara approximate ten thousands people work together here.

CII at Chhindwara 
The Confederation of Indian Industry (CII) started its operation in August 2007 at Chhindwara with the opening of a secretariat at Madhuvan Colony. Initially, CII worked largely upon small agricultural conferences, "Kisan Goshthis" as the district is predominantly an agrarian economy. In September 2008 CII inaugurated first of its kind the National Center of Excellence for Skill Development catering to the need of skilled workforce for the Indian industry. Companies such as Punj Lloyd, JCB India Ltd. and Toyota Kirloskar Motors (TKM) are imparting training in trades.

Initially, Ambuja Cement and L&T ECC division started trades of masonry and bar bending respectively but had to wind up as the trades were not very well taken by the masses. However, Ambuja Cement has recently started a training center at Amarwara and L&T ECC is constantly picking up youth from the rural areas for training at their well-established centers at Chennai and Hyderabad. As of now, the CII's National Center of Excellence for Skill Development is operating out of WCL's Campus, Parmanand Rehabilitation Center at Chakkar Road near Satpuda Club. Some 600 trainees have been trained in trades such as welding and fitting by Punj Lloyd, backhoe loader operation by JCB and TTEP (a motor mechanic course) by TKM. Companies such as CAT, Cummins, Mahindra & Mahindra and GMR will start their training here. The center is under the aegis of Mr. Kamalnath, the MP from Chhindwara and the Minister for Road Transport and Highways. The future is very bright for this unique center as it is helping the cause of the Indian government skill development program.

Driving School at Chhindwara

A joint venture IDTR. Under the 12th Plan was envisaged between Ministry of Road Transport and Highways and Ashok Leyland Ltd. The stone laying for Ashok Leyland Institute for Driving Training & Research was done in the year 2010, in the hands of Shri. Kamal Nath. This was the first AL IDTR with hostel facility for students mainly aiming to produce the well trained commercial vehicle drivers for road transport sector. After the completion of construction, the IDTR was inaugurated on 18 February 2013, by Shri Kamal Nath in the presence of several dignitaries both from the government and the company.

Spread over 15 acres, this IDTR is equipped with all necessary facilities for commercial vehicle driver training like state of the art driver training simulator, tracks of various configuration, computerized classrooms, experienced trainers from army, various vehicles from tipper to cars, cut sections of major automobile aggregates, Hostel and mess, etc. As of date the institute has trained more over 15500 drivers since inception. Major programs run are ASDC sponsored program for fresh drivers, Rise India sponsored program for fresh drivers, Pradhan Mantri Kaushal Vikas Yojana (PMKVY) program for fresh drivers, fresh drivers training sponsored through Forest Department, etc. Also MoRTH sponsored Road Safety refresher program was conducted for experienced drivers, Safe transportation of Hazardous goods program was conducted for BPCL, Defensive driving training for RIVIGO pilots, etc.

IDTR Chhindwara has initiated various social activities like visits of school children for traffic education, engineering, diploma and ITI colleges technical study tours, adoption of primary school at nearby village, Road safety awareness campaign in the area. Under its green drive, so far 7500 trees are planted. Meticulously designed syllabus for fresh drivers consists of Soft skills, behavioral aspects of driving, first aid, firefighting, HIV/AIDS, drugs, sports, yoga in addition to thorough driving training course. Medical checkup, eye test and insurance is done for all drivers.

In addition to tailor-made courses to suit the customer requirements, IDTR runs driving training programs of various durations, right from one day to one month. There are courses of 1, 2, 3 and 5 days for experienced drivers on road safety, defensive driving, hazchem, fuel saving, etc. and one-month program for fresh drivers. The IDTR will address the huge shortage of trained commercial drivers in the area and all drivers are placed either in government jobs, transport companies or at big private fleet owners. Quality of drivers trained at IDTR put them ahead of other drivers in the race of employment.

Tourist attractions

The main tourist attractions in and around Chhindwara include:
It is built on a hill which is fortified by a deep valley clothed with dense reserve forest. The fort is approachable up to its foot by motor road. The nature is beautiful here. Deogarh Fort was built by King Jatav of Gond. It was the capital of Gondwana dynasty until the 18th century. The architecture is somewhat similar to that of Mughal. There are a big fort palace and beautiful buildings. It is believed that there was a secret underground passage connecting Devgarh to Nagpur. Here is a tank called "motitaka" and there is famous saying that the water in this tank never finishes. At present, Deogarh village is a small inhabitant's area. The ruins at this place speak of its past glory.
Patalkot, in the hilly block 'Tamia' of Chhindwara District, has acquired great importance because of its geographical and scenic beauty. Patalkot is a lovely landscape located at a depth of 1200–1500 feet in a valley. Because of the great depth, this place is christened as 'Patalkot' (patal means very deep, in Sanskrit). When one looks down from the top of the valley, the place looks like a horseshoe in shape. Earlier, people believed it as the entrance to 'Patal'. There is one more belief that after worshiping 'Lord Shiva' Prince Meghnath had gone to Patal-lok through this place only. People say that this place was ruled by kings in 18th and 19th centuries and that there was a long tunnel connecting this place to 'Pachmarhi' in Hoshangabad District. Because of the inaccessibility of this area, the tribals of this region were totally cut off from the civilized world. But, with the constant efforts being made by the government, tribals of this area started tasting the advantages of adopting civilized life. 'Patalkot' is attracting many tourists because of its geographical location, scenic beauty, culture of the people who live here, and the immense and rare herbal wealth. Deepak Acharya has done exceptionally good work in the field of herbal medicines and tribal life of Patalkot.
 Tamia Hills are around 45 km from Chhindwara. The steep hills, dense forests, and big winding ghats have all combined to make Tamia a beauty spot and a tourist place. A PWD rest house is picturesquely situated on a steep hill commanding an extensive view of the deep forests and mountainous ranges of Satpura notably Mahadeo and Chaura Pahad in the background. The view from the rest house is noted for its constantly shifting natural scenery which is inspiring to visitors. The government postal bungalow in Tamia is a pleasant place as it is in hilly range at  height above Mean Sea Level surrounded by dense forest. The sunrise and sunset scenes give a breath taking experience to the visitors. About 1.5 km from this bungalow there is a cave where in the holy 'Shivling' (the deity of Lord Shiva) of 'Chota Mahadev' exists. Just beside the cave is a small water fall. Both of these provide a feast to the eyes of the visitors.
Gotmar Mela of Pandhurna: 98 km from Chhindwara, in the headquarters of Pandhurna tahsil, a unique fair (mela in Hindi) by name 'Gotmar Mela' is celebrated every year on the second day to 'Bhadrapad' New Moon day on the banks of the river Jam. A long tree is erected in the middle of the river with a flag at its very top. The residents of the villages Savargaon and Pandhurna gather on either bank and start pelting stones ('got') at the persons of the opposite village who try to cross into the mid of the river and remove the flag on top of the tree trunk. The village whose resident succeeds in removing the flag is considered victorious. The whole activity happens amidst the chanting of the sacred name of 'Maa' Durgaji. Several people have been wounded in this celebration and the district administration made elaborate arrangements for the smooth conduct of this rare fair. People have been left dead or injured, so the festival has now been banned.Administration is now fail to stop the activity.
 The Tribal Museum started in Chhindwara on 20 April 1954 and acquired 'State Museum' status in 1975. On 8 September 1997 the Tribal Museum's name was changed to "Shri Badal Bhoi State Tribal Museum". This museum is maintained by a Museum In-charge Officer with the help of artists and peons. It comprises 14 rooms, 3 galleries and two open galleries. It depicts the tribal cultures of 45 (approx.) tribal communities living in Madhya Pradesh and Chhattisgarh states. It is the oldest and the biggest tribal museum in Madhya Pradesh. It is a treasure house, storing antique and rare collections of items related to the tribal living in the district. One can find items related to the houses, clothes, ornaments, arms, agriculture tools, art, music, dance, celebrations, the deities worshiped by them, religious activities, herbal collections, and so on. The museum throws light on the rich traditions and ancient cultures of the tribal communities. It has depicted the family living styles of the ground and Baiga, the principal tribes living in the district. Also it has shown how the Agria tribes mould iron and shows Patalkots Deha agricultural systems. These exhibits attract the tourists. The museum is a one-stop collection-cum-information centre on the tribes of this district.
 Shashti Mata Mandir is located at Kapurda, almost 45 km north of Chhindwara. This temple is very old and famous for its cultural influence on the region. It attracts a number of tourists almost every day, but Tuesday is considered to be the best day for worship. It is believed that if Shrashti Mata is invoked with faith, she dispels disease. Some visitors come for the mundan ceremony (the first hair cutting ceremony) of their children and offer their crop of hair at the altar of goddess. Among other visitors, married couples come to invoke the blessings of the goddess for a happy married life. This temple was built by late B.L. Shrivastava in 1939. At present the temple management is taken care of by his sons L.L. Shrivastava and S.S. Shrivastava and well supported by all villagers but specially Mishra family has huge impact on that and managed all events, functions with them. The temple can be reached by local buses or taxis from Chhindwara.
 Waterfalls of Kukdi-khapa and Lilahi [DAHNORA] The picturesque location of Kukdi khapa waterfall is found along the Chhindwara to Nagpur narrow gauge railway line, between the stations of Umaranala and Ramakona. The waterfall is situated in the panoramic 'Sillevani' mountain range. The location is more beautiful and picturesque immediately after a spell of good rains. While travelling in the train along the narrow gauge railway toward Nagpur one can see this beautiful picnic spot. The Lilahi [DHANORA]waterfall is located in the downstream of the District's second biggest river, 'Kanhan'. This fall is situated on the route from Mohkhed to Pandhurna via Devgarh. It is close to the 'Narayan Ghat,' near dhanora village on the Kanhaan river. The lovely sight of the waterfall surrounded by mountain rocks and colorful nature is indeed a feast to the visitor. The waterfall will have a sufficient flow of water from July to January.
A hill stream with hot and boiling sulphur springs flows near the village. These springs, at a further distance, assume the form of a nullah (short stream). The water is believed to be beneficial for skin diseases and for certain impurities of the blood.
The entrance gate to the main temple is said to date back between 7th and 10th century. It is believed that at one time an area of 264 x  inside the gate was surrounded by a rampart. The stone slabs of the gate are fastened together with iron hooks. An illegible inscription can be found on one of the stone pillars of the temple. There is a reference to Raja Krishna III of Rashtrakut kingdom. The design of the gate is in Bahmanic style.
Hinglag Mata Mandir, at Ambada (Mohan Colliery, Muari road) almost 40 km (by the Parasia road) south of Chhindwara is one of the notable temples in Chhindwara. It attracts a number of tourists almost every day, but Tuesday and Saturday are considered to be the best days for worship.
Ram Mandir, a Hindu temple dedicated to Lord Ram, located at the heart of the city, is considered the oldest temple of the city.  It was constructed with the old beam and bracket system. In front of Ram mandir there is Badi Mata Mandir, dedicated to goddess Durga.
Jama Masjid  is located at Gole Ganj area, almost at the centre of Chhindwara. It is considered as a historical place because it was constructed by famous freedom fighters, the Shaukat Ali Brothers. The Masjid is decorated by Arabic calligraphy, in Mughal and Turkish style
Simariya Kalan- 101 feet Statue of Hanuman built by former union minister and current MLA of Chhindwara Shri Kamal Nath. This temple complex is spread over five acres of land. The temple complex is situated in such a way that it seems like the statue of Lord Hanuman is giving blessings to the devotees. Simariya Kalan village belongs to Mohkhed subdistrict of Chhindwara district of Madhya Pradesh state of India.
 Sahaja Yoga Thousands of followers of Sahaja Yoga  come every year to Chhindwara to visit the birthplace of H.H.Shri Mataji Nirmala Devi, founder of Sahaja Yoga. She was born on 21 March 1923 to a Christian family in Chhindwara, India (http://www.chhindwara.org).  Her parents were Prasad Salve and Cornelia Salve, direct descendants of the royal Shalivahana dynasty. Seeing the beauty of this child who was born with a spotless brilliance, they called her Nirmala, which means 'Immaculate'.  Later on, she came to be known by the multitudes by the name of H.H.Shri Mataji Nirmala Devi – the revered Mother – who was born with her complete Self Realization and knew from a very young age that she had a unique gift which had to be made available to all mankind. Her parents played a key role in India's Liberation Movement from under British rule. Her father, a close associate of Mahatma Gandhi, was a member of the Constituent Assembly of India and helped write free India's first constitution. He was a renowned scholar, master of 14 languages, and translated the Koran into Marathi. Her mother was the first woman in India to receive an Honors Degree in Mathematics.

Culture 
Chhindwara District has a majority of tribal population. The tribal communities include the Gond, Pardhan, Bharia, Korku. Hindi, Gondi, Urdu, Korku, Musai etc. so many languages/dialects are in use in the district. The majority of the tribal people speak in Gondi and Hindi mixed with Marathi.

Among the most celebrated cultural functions/festivals in the district are Pola, Bhujalia, Meghnath, Akhadi, Harijyoti etc.  The 'Gotmar Mela' of Pandhurna is a unique and world-renowned fair. On Shivrathri day 'Mahadev Mela' is celebrated each year on "chourgadh".

Chhindwara is the home of many famous temples and mosques. Many festivals and dances are celebrated in Chhindwara and nearby villages. Sela dance, Gedi dance, Nagpanchmi dance to name a few. Famous festivals in nearby villages include Chouth ka dangal and panchmi ka mela.

Education

Schools 
Chhindwara has more than 300 state-sponsored schools, which are affiliated to the Madhya Pradesh Board of Secondary Education (MPBSE). In addition, there are two Kendriya Vidyalayas in the city, affiliated to the Central Board of Secondary Education (CBSE).  The city is also served by numerous other private schools affiliated to either CBSE, ICSE, MPBSE.

Schools include:-
Nirmal Public School
Delhi Public School, Chhindwara
Jawahar Navodaya Vidyalaya, Singodi
Govt excellence school 
Nirmala English Medium Sen. Sec. School 
Edify School Chhindwara 
Sant Sri Asharamji Gurukul
First Step School
Vidya Niketan Hr. Sec. School
Arihant international school
Balaji Public H.S. School 
Danielson H M School Chhindwara
Delhi public school
Gyan Ganga Higher Secondary school
Jai Gurudev International School
Podar International SchooL
Vidya Bhumi Public School
Kendriya Vidyalaya
Maharshi Vidya Mandir School 
Bharat Bharati School
Sunrays School
Rose Public School
Danielson English Medium School
Model convent HS English Medium School
Anjuman English Medium School
Some of notable Hindi medium schools:-

Vidya Niketan School
St. Joseph School
Excellence School
MLB Girls School
Saraswati Shishu Mandir
Bharti Vidya Mandir School
Shri Shanti Nath higher secondary school
Gyan Bharti Higher Secondary School Chandangaon
Bhagwan Shri Chand public school

Higher education 

Chhindwara is relatively developed from its neighboring districts in terms of education and there are opportunities available for students in almost all disciplines.

Raja Shankar Shah University

Raja Shankar Shah University, formerly known as Chhindwara University, is a state university in Chhindwara.
It is the only state university in the  Satpura region and provides degrees to most non-technical colleges in and around Chhindwara. Funded by the state government, the university has a residential campus and serves as an affiliating university for colleges of Four other districts. The institution affiliates the colleges of Chhindwara district and other neighbouring districts like Betul, Seoni and Balaghat. It is established in the year 2019 May by state Government.

Chhindwara Institute of Medical Sciences

It is a state-run Medical School under the State Medical University of MP. The school provides degree courses such as MBBS and MD.

Annie Institute of Technology & Research Centre

It is a privately run Engineering School under the State Technical University of MP and it provides degree courses such as Bachelor of Engineering etc.

Apparel Training & Design Centre

Apparel Training & Design Centre, Chhindwara (ATDC) Apparel Training & Design Centre (ATDC) has emerged as Vocational Training Network for the Apparel Sector. Nearby FDDI, Chhindwara.

District Learning Center (DLC), NIIT Foundation

Situated at NIIT District Learning Center National Highway 69A, Emalia Bohta, Chhindwara, Madhya Pradesh, India.

Footwear Design and Development Institute

Footwear Design and Development Institute, Chhindwara Situated at Corner Plot, Khasra No. 31, Nagpur-Betul Road, Imlikheda Chowk, Chhindwara, Madhya Pradesh, India.

Danielson Degree College

Danielson Degree College is situated at Nagpur Road, came into existence in July - 1970 under the guidance and initiative of Late Rt. Rev. Rubin Israelson (Bishop of Chhindwara).

Government PG College

It is situated at Dharam Tekri near Khajri. It was started in 1961 and affiliated to Rani Durgawati Vishwavidyalaya, Jabalpur which previously with Harisingh Gaur University, Sagar.

Government Polytechnic College

Indira Gandhi Government Polytechnic College Chhindwara
Situated in Chhindwara, It was established in 12 September 1998 to offer 3-year diploma courses. At present the college has Two diploma branches Modern Office Management & Computer Science & Engineering.

Government Polytechnic College Khirsadoh, Chhindwara 
Situated in Khirsadoh, Chhindwara, established in the year 1958. At present the college has seven diploma branches Mining, Civil, Mechanical, Electrical, Electronics & Telecommunication, Computer Science & Engineering.), IT ( Information technology).

Indira Priyadarshini College

Indira Priyadarshini College, situated at Parasia Road, is offering some professional courses like B.B.A, B.C.A, Msc & BSc Microbiology, Biotechnology, and Botany. This was established in 2001.

R.S. Government Girls College

Situated at the heart of the town. Established in 1982, this college has now a strength of around 2500 girl students.

Satpura Law College

Satpura Law College which was established by the Satpura Education Society, Chhindwara, in 1961–62, is located in Mohan Nagar near the Bus Stand.

Soni College of Management and Technology

G. H. Raisoni University

G.H. Raisoni University is a private university located in the village Dhoda Borgaon in Chhindwara district, Madhya Pradesh, India. The university was established in 2016 by the GHR Sons Educational and Medical Research Foundation through Madhya Pradesh Niji Vishwavidyalaya (Sthapana Ewam Sanchalan) Sanshodhan Adhyadesh, 2016, an Ordinance which also established Symbiosis University of Applied Sciences and the yet to be operational (as of April 2018) D.C. University. It is part of the Raisoni Group of Institutions (RGI).

ITC Culinary Skills Training Centre

This centre is located in Mohan Nagar at IIS Chhindwara campus and is a CSR project of ITC ltd, where the youth are trained free of cost for 6 months in professional kitchen skills which helps them to get employment in various star category hotels, restaurants and catering organizations. Candidates must be above 18 years of age, medically fit and with a minimum 10th/12th standard qualification to enroll in the programme.

Transportation 
Chhindwara is connected to its neighboring districts by rail and road both. The nearest airport is Nagpur Airport (130 km).  A small airport is located in Chhindwara which is not serviceable for  big passenger planes and can only serve small private aircraft. Chhindwara is connected to nearby big cities like Nagpur, Jabalpur and Bhopal with frequent buses and taxi services round the clock.

Road

National Highway 547 is a National Highway in central India passes through Chhindwara. It connects Saoner in Maharashtra to Narsinghpur in Madhya Pradesh.

National Highway 347 also passes through the city. It connects Multai and Seoni.

Railways

Chhindwara railway station is part of the Satpura Railway and is shown on the Bilaspur-Nagpur section of Howrah-Nagpur-Mumbai line. It has the following trains running daily:
 Panchvalley Express between Chhindwara and Indore Junction
 Patalkot Express between Chhindwara and Ferozpur Railway Station via Bhopal - Bina Mathura
 Amla Memu between Chhindwara and Amla
 Betul Passenger between Chhindwara and Betul
 Nagpur Passenger between Chhindwara and Itwari (This train covers the distance of 147 km in around eight hours and travels through some beautiful scenic valleys)

Notable people 
 Kamal Nath, 18th Chief Minister of Madhya Pradesh
 Pearl V Puri, Television actor
 Nirmala Srivastava, Religious leader
 Mubeen Saudagar, Indian stand-up comedian and mimicry artist

 Nakul Nath, Indian politician Member of Parliament from Chhindwara
Anusuiya Uikey, Indian politician,Governor of Chhattisgarh
Bhawna Dehariya, International Mountaineer
Pakhi Tyrewala, Indian writer and film director

References

 
Cities and towns in Chhindwara district
Cities in Madhya Pradesh